Beyn Kalayeh (also Romanized as Beyn Kalāyeh, Bin Kalayeh, and Bīn Kelāyeh) is a village in Shirju Posht Rural District, Rudboneh District, Lahijan County, Gilan Province, Iran. At the 2006 census, its population was 883, in 259 families.

References 

Populated places in Lahijan County